The Left – The Rainbow (SA), frequently referred as Rainbow Left, was a left-wing federation of parties in Italy that participated in the 2008 general election.

History
The federation was officially launched on 8–9 December 2007 with the goal of uniting Italian communist, socialist and ecologist parties in a united bloc, somewhat similar to what the centre-left forces have done with the Democratic Party and before that The Olive Tree.

The four parties tended to disagree on a number of issues, including the support for the Prodi II Cabinet, the symbol and the name of the  federation, with the Greens wanting the word "ecologist" and the Italian Communists the hammer and sickle to be included, but in the end they formed a joint list for the 2008 general election.

In the election The Left – The Rainbow gained a disastrous 3.1% of the vote (down from 10.2%, combined result of the three parties in 2006 general election) and failed to gain any seats in the Italian Parliament. Shortly after, the Party of Italian Communists announced it would leave the federation, and the Communist Refoundation Party did the same soon after.  These groups went on to launch the Anticapitalist and Communist List, which later became the Federation of the Left.  Meanwhile, the Greens and Democratic Left, together with  the Socialist Party, Movement for the Left and Unite the Left, formed Left Ecology Freedom.

Composition
The federation, defined by its members as the sinistra radicale (which can be translated in English as both "radical left" and "far left"), was composed of four parties:

Electoral results

Italian Parliament

References

2007 establishments in Italy
2008 disestablishments in Italy
Communist organisations in Italy
Defunct political party alliances in Italy
History of the Communist Refoundation Party
Political parties disestablished in 2008
Political parties established in 2007